Protuliocnemis biplagiata is a species of moth of the family Geometridae first described by Frederic Moore in 1887. It is found in Indo-Australian tropics east to New Caledonia (it is not present on the Solomons and Vanuatu).

The larvae have been recorded on Acacia species.

External links

Geometrinae